Rakiraki is a district in Fiji's Ra Province.  It is located between Tavua and Korovou when travelling along the Kings Road, on the northern coast of Viti Levu, Fiji's largest island.

At the 1996 census, the Rakiraki district had a population of 29,137, with 15,325 in the smaller Rakiraki sub-district.  Of these, 3361 lived in Vaileka, Rakiraki's principal urban centre.  The Fiji Times reported on 4 October 2006 that Uraia Waqa, Chairman of the Rakiraki Local Government Authority, had called for Vaileka to be officially incorporated as a Town in order to attract government investment. Local Government and Urban Development Minister Chaitanya Lakshman was reported to be sympathetic to the proposal. The main township is Rakiraki town locally known as Vaileka.

Rakiraki is an area often said to portray Fijian patriotism. Many noted Fijian politicians have originated from this area, such as Sidiq Koya, who fought for Fijian workers' rights. Others include Tomasi Vuetilovoni, Meli Bolobolo, Joji Banuve, Subas Chand, Devi Prasad, Dhiren Prasad lawyer and George Shiu Raj. 
Traditional Fijian villages in the Rakiraki district are Namuaimada, Navolau Number 1, Navolau Number 2, Navutulevu, Navuavua, Malake & Nakorokula.

Landmarks
Prominent landmarks include Navatu Rock, in Vitawa village, believed to be one of Fiji's oldest human settlements.  Pottery excavated at the base of the rock has been dated to around 1000BC.

About 1.5 kilometers offshore lies the island of Nananu-i-Ra.  Fijian mythology holds that this island is the disembodied spirits' point of departure from this world to the afterlife.  A village once crowned the peak of this island.

The tomb of Ratu Udre Udre, a famous 19th century cannibal chief who reportedly consumed more than 800 of his victims, is close to the township of Vaileka.

The renowned Nakauvadra Range which is associated with Fijian mythology is visible from anywhere in the Rakiraki district. It is also the main contributing factor to the dry conditions that prevail throughout much of the year in the Rakiraki region.

Economic activities
Agriculture and tourism are the mainstays of the Rakiraki economy.  The Fiji Sugar Corporation operates the Penang Sugar Mill on the Penang River, one kilometer north-east of Vaileka. Sugar cane is grown in the valleys, while cattle are raised in the highlands.  Root crops, including yaqona (kava) are also cultivated. Fiji water is bottled 20kilometres west of the main town of Rakiraki.

References

Rakiraki District